Sripal Singh Yadav is an Indian politician.  He was elected to the Lok Sabha, the lower house of the Parliament of India  as a member of the Janata Dal.

References

External links
Official biographical sketch in Parliament of India website

1942 births
Lok Sabha members from Uttar Pradesh
India MPs 1989–1991
India MPs 1991–1996
Janata Dal politicians
Living people